The Oscar and Christina Beckman Farmstead, in Bonneville County, Idaho near Idaho Falls, Idaho, was built in 1896. It was listed on the National Register of Historic Places in 1991.

It includes work by a Swedish-American farmer-carpenter named Jacob Severin Adolphson, who contributed to building the house and some of its outbuildings.

The house is of "double-cell type", with elements of Queen Anne and Colonial Revival styles.

It includes a basilica-plan barn with half-story loft, built in 1914, and a pig shed.

It is located at the southwestern corner of the junction of New Sweden-Shelley Rd. and U.S. Route 20.

References

National Register of Historic Places in Bonneville County, Idaho
Queen Anne architecture in Idaho
Colonial Revival architecture in Idaho
Buildings and structures completed in 1896